Rejina (Reji) Thomas is an American glass artist who has thrived as a painter and artistic community advocate. In 1995 Thomas reproduced the intricate glass work for the restoration of the Texas Capitol building. She was commissioned by the State of Texas to create gifts for the President of Mexico and Queen Elizabeth of England. IBM and 3M are among the corporations that have commissioned her engraved and etched-glass awards. Her artwork has been collected by Ann Richards, Barbara Jordan, B.B. King, and Steven Spielberg. Thomas is the founder of Graphic Glass Studios Inc. and the Pine Street Station.

Formative years
Thomas was born in Los Angeles. Her mother was a registered nurse and her father an electrical engineer. Early in life she was sent to live with her grandparents on the family's farm in Evergreen, Alabama.  At the age of 15, while in art class, Thomas sold her first painting.  Later, as a medic in the Air Force she began using a diamond dental drill to create images on glass, developing a steady hand and eye for detail.  Thomas graduated from the International Pilchuck School of Glass based in Seattle, Washington.

Capitol restoration
During the 1995 comprehensive interior restoration of the Texas Capitol, Thomas was contracted to replicate all of the intricate glass work in the Capitol Building. The restoration project was intensive and included approximately 600 panels of glass, which had to be matched to old specifications. Her experience with a rare double-acid etching process helped her win the contract. Thomas had created replacement panes for the Capitol before when fire damaged the Capitol during the mid-Eighties.

Awards and exhibitions
In 1990 Thomas' work was exhibited at Austin's Laguna Gloria Art Museum and at the Women and Their Work gallery. Her studio, Graphic Glass Studios Inc. was recognized by The Austin Chronicle Best Of Awards as the "Best Acid Drop For Art's Sake".  In 2004 The Austin Chronicle recognized her 11th Street mural as the 'Best Look Back at the New Eastside' referring to it as a masterpiece, and a "soul-sending work of art". In October 2017 State of Ascension: Mixed Media Vessel Works exhibition opened at the George Carver Museum.  It featured two decades of Rejina Thomas' art.  A theme embodied in her meticulously crafted containers and painting "position the womb as a metaphorical looking glass from which viewers experience and understand the world."

References

External links 
 
 Graphic Glass with Rejina Thomas video

Year of birth missing (living people)
Living people
21st-century American women artists
Artists from Los Angeles
American glass artists